James Keating may refer to:

 Sir James Keating (cleric)  (died c. 1491), Irish cleric and statesman
 James Keating (hurler) (born 1999), Irish hurler
 James Alfred Keating (1897–1976), American World War I flying ace
 James J. Keating (1895–1978), United States Marine Corps general